is a mountain within the Ōu Mountains on the border of Miyagi Prefecture and Yamagata Prefecture in the Tōhoku region of northern Japan. The mountain is also known as  when viewed from Yamagata prefecture.

Name
Several mountains around Japan are called "Funagata" due to their resemblance to the hull of a boat when viewed from certain angles. The name of "Mount Goshō" comes from a local legend that exiled Emperor Juntoku escaped from his prison on Sado island and lived in obscurity at the base of this mountain. Yet another legend states that the name comes from the five peaks of the mountain. This has also led to the term , which is used in the name of Funagata Renpō Prefectural Natural Park, although all five peaks are part of the same stratovolcano. The other peaks that compose the Funagata volcano include Mount Ushiroshirahige (後白髪山), Mount Mitsumine (三峰山), and Mount Izumigatake (泉ヶ岳).   Izumigatake is the most famous of these mountains, with two ski resorts and several camping areas.  Izumigatake is also the namesake of Izumi-ku, Sendai.

Mount Kurohana (黒鼻山) was traditionally considered part of Mount Funagata; however, recent research has revealed that Mount Kurohana should be considered a separate volcano.

Geology
Mount Funagata is an active stratovolcano formed from the end of the Tertiary period to the beginning of the Quaternary when the Ōu Mountains were raised from the sea. Mount Izumigatake is the oldest peak, created around 1.2 million years ago.  The current main  mountain body was completed by repeated volcanic activity from 600,000 to 850,000 years ago. Mount Funagata is made up of andesite, which is easily distinguished from the pigeonite basalt that erupted from Mout Kurohana.  The crater that produced Mount Izumigatake is located on a ridge between Izumigatake and Kita-izumigatake (North Izumigatake).

References

Bibliography

External links

 

 

Funagata
Funagata
Funagata
Funagata
Subduction volcanoes
Taiwa, Miyagi
Kami, Miyagi
Sendai
Pleistocene stratovolcanoes